The 2001 Stan James World Matchplay was a darts tournament held in the Empress Ballroom at the Winter Gardens, Blackpool. This was the second World Matchplay tournament to be sponsored by UK bookmaker Stan James.

The tournament ran from 29 July–4 August 2001, and was won by Phil Taylor.

Prize money
The prize fund was £65,000.

Seeds

Results

References

World Matchplay (darts)
World Matchplay Darts